Stephen Beal  is an American artist recognized for his colorful grid paintings. In addition to his artistic career, Beal is an educator and since 2008 has been the president of the California College of the Arts in San Francisco and Oakland, California.

Education
Beal attended Occidental College in Los Angeles, California, and earned his M.F.A. from The School of the Art Institute of Chicago.

Career
Since 1972, Beal has had numerous exhibitions of his work, and has received many commissions and grants.

From 1973 to 1977 he was a part-time instructor and technician at The School of the Art Institute of Chicago. From 1980 to 1983, he was assistant professor of art appreciation, collage, photography studio, and design studio at Elmhurst College in Elmhurst, Illinois.

From 1993 to 1995 he served as chair of graduate design and as an associate professor of painting at The School of the Art Institute of Chicago. From 1995 to 1997, he was vice president of academic planning and associate vice president of academic affairs at The School of the Art Institute of Chicago. He taught courses in studio painting and still-life painting, and was a  graduate and post-baccalaureate advisor. He was also a faculty counselor in admissions.

Beal was appointed provost of the California College of the Arts in 1997. He was appointed president of the California College of the Arts in 2008.

References

External links
Official bio at California College of the Arts
Youtube Stephen Beal Appointed President of CCA
Artslant Stephen Beal's artist profile
Columbia.edu Bio

21st-century American painters
21st-century American male artists
Living people
California College of the Arts
American male painters
Year of birth missing (living people)